During the 1950–51 English football season, Brentford competed in the Football League Second Division. Amidst a period of transition, the Bees repeated the previous season's 9th-place finish.

Season summary 

Jackie Gibbons' Brentford began the 1950–51 season with Billy Dare as the only recognised goalscorer on the club's books. The squad was augmented by young forward Bernard Kelly and former Blackpool right half Ken Horne replaced the retired Malky MacDonald. Aside from four wins in a row in August and September 1950, Brentford had a torrid first half of the season and fell to just one place above relegation by mid-November. Injuries and constant tinkering meant manager Gibbons had been unable to field a settled XI.

A 4–0 win over Southampton on Boxing Day was the turning point. A new half back line was formed, with forwards Tony Harper and Jimmy Hill moving back to play alongside captain Ron Greenwood. Fred Monk, who had been converted into a full back, was re-deployed in his original forward position. Manager Jackie Gibbons also recruited football analyst Charles Reep in February 1951. Fred Monk, Billy Sperrin and Billy Dare scored regularly from mid-January 1951 through to the end of the season and helped the team secure a second-successive 9th-place finish. Monk set a new club record when he scored in 10 consecutive matches between February and April 1951.

League table

Results
Brentford's goal tally listed first.

Legend

Football League Second Division

FA Cup

 Sources: Statto, 11v11, 100 Years Of Brentford

Playing squad 
Players' ages are as of the opening day of the 1950–51 season.

 Sources: 100 Years Of Brentford, Timeless Bees

Coaching staff

Statistics

Appearances and goals

Players listed in italics left the club mid-season.
Source: 100 Years Of Brentford

Goalscorers 

Players listed in italics left the club mid-season.
Source: 100 Years Of Brentford

Management

Summary

Transfers & loans

References 

Brentford F.C. seasons
Brentford